WRUB may refer to:

 WRUB (FM), a radio station (106.5 FM) licensed to serve Sarasota, Florida, United States
 WRUB (college radio), a college radio station at University at Buffalo